Pader is a town in Pader District in the Northern Region of Uganda. The town is administered by the Pader Town Council, an urban local government. It is the largest metropolitan area in the district and the site of the district headquarters.

Location
Pader is bordered by Pajule to the north, Parabong to the northeast, Lira Palwo to the east, Puranga to the south, and Awere to the west. The town is approximately
, by road, southeast of Kitgum, the nearest large town. The coordinates of the town are 2°52'43.0"N, 33°05'06.0"E (Latitude:2.8786; Longitude:33.0850).

Overview
Pader sprang up in 2000, the same year that Pader District was formed. The town soon became a center of foreign relief agencies assisting the civilian population affected by the Lord's Resistance Army insurgency. While over US$2 million has been poured into this effort, there is little to show for it because of corruption, poor planning, poor implementation, poor follow up, poor management, lack of accountability, and a hands-off approach by many of the donor agencies.

Population

The 2002 national census estimated the population of the town at about 8,700. The Uganda Bureau of Statistics (UBOS) estimated the population at 12,800 in 2010. In 2011, UBOS estimated the mid-year population at 13,500. In August 2014, the national population census enumerated the population of the town at 14,080.

In 2015, the population of the town was projected at 13,500. In 2020, the mid-year population of Pader Town was projected at 14,800. It was calculated that the population of the town increased at an average annual rate of 1.9 percent, between 2015 and 2020.

Points of interest
The following additional points of interest lie within or near the town of Pader:
 headquarters of the 5th Division of the Uganda People's Defence Force
 Olwor Nguur Primary School
 Pader Girls Academy
 Archbishop Flynn Secondary School
 Paipir Primary School
 Pader Kilak Primary School
 Pader central market
 Ayoro restaurant

See also
 Acholi sub-region
 List of cities and towns in Uganda
 List of roads in Uganda

References

External links
 About the Pader Girls' Academy

Populated places in Northern Region, Uganda
Cities in the Great Rift Valley
Pader District
Acholi sub-region